The N4 is a national route in South Africa that runs from Skilpadshek on the Botswana border, past Rustenburg, Pretoria, eMalahleni and Mbombela, to Komatipoort on the Mozambique border. It forms the South African section of the Trans-Kalahari Corridor, which runs from Walvis Bay to Maputo, meaning that it links the east and west coasts of Southern Africa. Since the completion of the A2 through Botswana, the entire Corridor is now a world-class standard highway; it features at least one carriageway in each direction of high-speed traffic plus a paved shoulder for its entire length.

The South African section can be divided into two parts with Pretoria in the middle. The western portion links Gaborone and Lobatse in Botswana with Pretoria (Named the Platinum Highway), while the eastern portion links Pretoria with Mbombela in Mpumalanga and Maputo in Mozambique (named the Maputo Corridor).

The eastern section from Pretoria to Middelburg is a four-lane dual-carriageway tolled freeway opened in 1968, with toll gates at Donkerhoek and just west of Middelburg. The freeway from eMalahleni to Middelburg was one of the first concrete freeways built in South Africa and the Ultra City was the first service station built on the sides of a freeway. At eMalahleni (formerly Witbank), the freeway converges with the N12 from Johannesburg. An alternative route to the N4, known as the R104, runs between Pretoria and Wonderfontein (east of Middelburg). Between eMalahleni and Middelburg the alternative is the dangerous R555. After Wonderfontein the toll road runs along the old alignment of the N4 until the Lebombo Border Post. From Middelburg to Belfast the N4 is a single-carriageway highway with two lanes in both directions; thereafter, the N4 is a wide shouldered single-carriageway highway. The section east of Middelburg has been significantly improved, including a northern bypass of Mbombela, and now features some new grade-separated junctions. The N4 east of Pretoria forms part of the Maputo Corridor Toll Route.

Route

North West
The entire section of the N4 in the North-West Province is known as the Platinum Highway and is part of the Trans-Kalahari Corridor.

The N4 Route begins at the Skilpadshek Border Post with Botswana, where it is designated as the A2 Road on the Botswana Side towards Lobatse. The border post on the Botswana side is known as Pioneer Gate. The N4 Route begins by going south-east for 50 kilometres to reach a junction with the R49.

The N4 and the R49 are cosigned north-east as one road into the CBD of the town of Zeerust. Just before Zeerust Shopping Centre, the R49 becomes its own road northwards towards the Gaborone (Kopfontein) border with Botswana, leaving the N4 as the main road through Zeerust eastwards (Church Street). The N4 proceeds eastwards for 67 kilometres, passing Groot Marico and the River of the same name, through the Swartruggens Toll Plaza, to the town of Swartruggens, where it meets the northern terminus of the R53 and R509 roads and passes through the central part of the town as Andries Pretorius Street.

From the junction with the R509, the N4 goes eastwards for 45 kilometres to reach the town of Rustenburg. Just before Rustenburg, the N4 meets the north-eastern terminus of the R52 road. Just west of Rustenburg, the N4 meets the R104 (eastbound off-ramp only), which is a road that is an alternative to the N4 and is sometimes designated to roads that were previously part of the N4.

As the R104 provides access to the Rustenburg Central Business District, the N4 turns south-east and bypasses the city centre to the south, becoming a four-lane dual carriageway. Adjacent to the Waterfall Mall of Rustenburg, the N4 meets the R24 Road, which provides access to the cities of Magaliesburg, Krugersdorp and Johannesburg in the south-east. From the R24 interchange, the N4 continues east-south-east for 6 kilometres to the town of Kroondal, where it meets the R104 Road again.

From Kroondal, the N4 continues eastwards for 36 kilometres, encountering the Marikana Toll Plaza, bypassing Mooinooi, to reach the town of Modderspruit (Bapong), where it meets the R556 Road which provides access to the resort of Sun City next to the Pilanesberg. It proceeds eastwards for 8 kilometres to reach an interchange with the R512 Road, which provides access to the city of Brits in the north and the city of Randburg (part of Johannesburg) via the western side of the Hartbeespoort Dam in the south.

The N4 proceeds eastwards for 7 kilometres to reach an interchange with the R511 Road, which provides access to the cities of Brits and Thabazimbi in the north and the city of Sandton (part of Johannesburg) via Hartbeespoort central to the south. The N4 proceeds eastwards for 13 kilometres to encounter the Brits Toll Plaza and crosses into the Gauteng Province just south of Ga-Rankuwa.

Gauteng
The N4 enters the City of Tshwane and becomes the northern section of the Pretoria Bypass.

From the Gauteng Province Border, the N4 proceeds eastwards for 16 kilometres, becoming a dual carriageway with 2 lanes in each direction, to reach an interchange with the R80 Highway (Mabopane Highway), which connects Mabopane and Soshanguve in the north with Pretoria in the south. The N4 proceeds eastwards for 10 kilometres to meet the R566, which provides access to the Annlin Suburb and to Wonderboom Airport. The N4 continues for another 12 kilometres eastwards to reach an interchange with the N1 Highway south of the N1's Pumulani Toll Plaza. The N4 encounters the Doornpoort Toll Plaza right before joining the N1.

From this interchange, the N1 and the N4 are cosigned southwards on the Eastern section of the Pretoria Bypass for 12 kilometres, bypassing Montana Park, up to the Proefplaas Interchange, where the road westwards from this interchange is Pretoria's M2 metropolitan route proceeding into the Pretoria CBD and the road eastwards is the N4 proceeding towards Mpumalanga Province while the Pretoria Eastern Bypass remains designated as the N1 towards Johannesburg. The Proefplaas Interchange, where the N4 leaves the Pretoria Eastern Bypass, marks the end of the N4 being known as the Platinum Highway. It also marks the end of the Trans-Kalahari Corridor. (The N4 now continues as part of the Maputo Corridor)

From the Proefplaas Interchange, the N4 goes eastwards for 48 kilometres, meeting the R515 Road & encountering a toll gate at Donkerhoek (Diamond Hill Toll Plaza), to reach the town of Bronkhorstspruit, where it meets the R25 Road. The N4 proceeds eastwards for 25 kilometres to leave the City of Tshwane and reach the town of Balmoral in Mpumalanga Province, where it meets the northern terminus of the R545 Road.

Mpumalanga
From Balmoral, the N4 proceeds eastwards for 25 kilometres to enter Witbank (eMalahleni). After the interchange with the R555 and R544 routes south of the eMalahleni City Centre, the N4 continues eastwards, meeting the eastern end of the N12 National Route from Johannesburg (westbound only), to bypass Middelburg to the south (where a tollgate is located just before the first Middelburg off-ramp), with the R575 and the R35 roads providing access to the city centre. South-east of Middelburg, the N4 meets the N11 National Route, which provides access to Middelburg Central in the north and to Ermelo in the south.

From The N11 Junction, the N4 goes eastwards for 57 kilometres to meet the R33 road, which provides access to the town of Belfast (eMakhazeni) just to the north. From eMakhazeni, the N4 continues eastwards for 22 kilometres to Machadodorp (eNtokozweni), where it meets the R36 Route and crosses the Elands River. The R36 joins the N4 and they are cosigned north-east for 8 kilometres, with the Machado Toll Plaza on this stretch, before the R36 becomes its own road northwards. The N4 continues eastwards for 100 kilometres, through Waterval Boven (where there is a short tunnel) and Ngodwana, to enter the city of Nelspruit (Mbombela). It is followed by the Crocodile River from the R539 (Schoemanskloof Pass) junction about 16 kilometres after Ngodwana.

As the old road through Nelspruit Central is designated as the R104 (Samora Machel Drive), the N4 bypasses the city to the north on a newer highway (opened on 13 June 2010), crossing to the northern side of the parallel Crocodile River, passing by Riverside Mall (where it meets the R37), before joining the old alignment east of the city and crossing back to the south of the Crocodile River. From Nelspruit, the N4 continues eastwards for 100 Kilometres, following the Crocodile River (which makes up the entire southern border of the Kruger National Park), meeting the north-eastern terminus of the R38 road at Kaapmuiden and passing by the Nkomazi Toll Plaza just east of Kaapmuiden, through Malalane, to reach the Lebombo Border Post with Mozambique at Komatipoort, where it crosses the Komati River and becomes the road which provides access to Maputo, the capital city of Mozambique (EN4). The border settlement on the Mozambique side is named Ressano Garcia.

Alternative Route 
The section from Rustenburg through Pretoria, Bronkhorstspruit, Witbank and Middelburg to Wonderfontein (approximately 50 km east of Middelburg) has a route running parallel to it, namely the R104 route. It passes through the town centres of every town while the N4 Highway bypasses every town between Rustenburg and Wonderfontein. Only the alternative route between Witbank and Middelburg has a different designation (it forms part of the R555 route rather than the R104). The R104 can be used to avoid the tollgates located on the N4 Highway between the mentioned towns.

As there is now a northern bypass in Mbombela (Nelspruit), the old route through the city centre (Samora Machel Drive; 17 km) has also been re-designated as the R104.

From the Skilpadshek Border Post through Swartruggens to Rustenburg, there is no alternative route. Also, from Wonderfontein through Belfast and Mbombela to the Komatipoort Border Post with Mozambique, there is no alternative route.

History and developments

Prior to 1990, the N4 used to be the section from Mozambique to the Proefplaas Interchange with the N1. However, two western sections of the N4 have been made since then:

Old Route through Pretoria
Originally the N4 ran through the Pretoria CBD on regular city streets, then exited the CBD westbound on Vom Hagen Street towards Hartbeespoort Dam as the Magalies Freeway, a toll road (one toll gate at either end; only one off-ramp along this stretch), completed in the early 1990s, before following the R511/R513/R512 regional routes over the Magaliesberg to meet the single-carriageway freeway built in the 1980s to a point northwest of Pretoria. All that remains of this routing of the N4 is the short 20 km Magalies Toll Freeway (designated as the M4 Metropolitan Route of Pretoria), a four-lane tolled dual-carriageway motorway that runs from the Vom Hagen Street/R55 junction in Pretoria West, past Atteridgeville, to Pelindaba, where the freeway abruptly ends with a junction with the R511. It is clear from the geometry of the western terminus that the N4 was to continue, but the necessary link from the end of the freeway at Hartbeespoort to the N4 extension west of Hartbeespoort has never been completed, even though it had been planned since the 1980s. An anomaly is the bridge over Hartbeespoort Dam near Kosmos Village which has the R512 route number, and the two obvious deviations off the alignment at either end of the bridge where the N4 was clearly intended to continue onward.

Where the N4 used to run through Pretoria, this has been renamed the M2 (from the N1 interchange to the M5 junction) and M4 (from the M5 junction to Hartbeespoort). The 1st section of the old route through Pretoria, from the N1 interchange to the M5 junction, is 2 one-way streets (Pretorius Street westwards and Francis Baard Street, formerly Schoeman Street, eastwards) and is part of the M2 Route of Pretoria. At the M5 junction, the old route leaves the M2 and joins the M5 Route of Pretoria, which is also two one-way streets (Steve Biko Street northwards and Hamilton Street southwards), for a short section. Just after crossing to the northern side of the parallel east-west R104 Route, the old route leaves the M5 and resumes going westwards. From the M5 junction, it is the M4 Route of Pretoria and it is once again two one-way streets (Johannes Ramokhoase Street, formerly Proes Street, westwards and Struben Street eastwards). At the junction with the M1 Route of Pretoria (Es'kia Mphahlele Drive), the M4 stops being two one-way streets and becomes one road westwards named Vom Hagen Street. At the junction with the R55 Route, Vom Hagen Street (M4) becomes the Magalies Toll Freeway and has the Quagga Toll Gate after this intersection. It only has one off-ramp north of Atteridgeville and at the western end, it has the Pelindaba Toll Gate and it ends at an off-ramp t-junction, with the road northwards connecting to the R511 Route to Hartbeespoort Central and the road southwards connecting to Pelindaba and Broederstroom (where the R512 Bridge over the Hartbeespoort Dam's western edge is located). However, the N4 designation has not yet been removed from the Magalies Freeway itself (N4 may still be labelled on signage on the highway & M4 may show on signs off the highway). Also, some maps may still label the entire old route through Pretoria's central and western suburbs as the N4 together with the newer route.

New Route
At Proefplaas Interchange with the N1, the N4 now follows the N1 North (Co-signed) to just north of Sefako Makgatho Drive (R513, formerly Zambezi Drive), where it splits off westward towards Rustenburg just before the Pumulani Toll Plaza on the N1, where it becomes the Platinum Highway. The N4 now bypasses Pretoria through the east and the north as a four-lane dual-carriageway motorway (the Pretoria Bypass). After Rosslyn, the N4 becomes a single carriageway highway, and joins the old R27 alignment at the R512 road to Brits. Three new grade-separated junctions were built before Rustenburg, as well as a new single-carriageway bypass of Rustenburg to the south of the town. Thereafter the N4 rejoins the old alignment of the R27 just west of Rustenburg, and passes along the R27 alignment through the towns of Swartruggens and Zeerust.  Just west of Zeerust, the N4 turns northwest towards the Botswana border.  The toll gates can be bypassed between Rustenburg and Pretoria by following the old Rustenburg Road, now the R104.

Extension of Old Route

As an extension of the old route from Pretoria Central through the Hartbeespoort area to the West, a new freeway has been built and opened on the western side of the Hartbeespoort Dam in the North West Province, named the Pampoen Nek Pass. This freeway was built in order for traffic coming from Pretoria West (and areas like Johannesburg) heading towards Brits, Sun City and Rustenburg to proceed without having to interfere with the local traffic of Hartbeespoort.

The Pampoen Nek Pass is an extension of the R512 Route, starting from the R512's interchange with the R560 Route (just after the R512 bridge crossing over the Hartbeespoort Dam's western edge west of Broederstroom) and going north for 6 kilometres up to the R512's interchange with the N4 south of Brits, where the Pampoen Nek Highway joins the N4 Westbound. So, for motorists heading for Sun City or Rustenburg (or the western side of Brits), this route will not only save substantial time for motorists travelling from the south of Hartbeespoort, but will also alleviate traffic congestion in Hartbeespoort, especially on the R511 Route and the routes around Damdoryn.

On 3 September 2020, the Minister of Transport, Fikile Mbalula, together with the South African National Roads Agency (SANRAL) and the Madibeng Local Municipality, officially opened the new road. During the opening of the freeway, SANRAL said that the second phase of the project will be to link the Pampoen Nek Highway to the M4 Freeway (Magalies Toll Route) to Pretoria.

Road signs on the new road indicate that the Pampoen Nek Pass is designated as the R512 from the R560 interchange to the next off-ramp (where the R512 turns northwards towards Brits).

Although this route is an extension of the R512 Route, it was constructed and is officially registered as part of National Route 4 Section 12, indicating that it is part of the old alignment of the N4, which was the main route from Pretoria into the North West Province before the northern section of the Pretoria Bypass was made.

Operations

The N4 West Platinum Highway toll route (west of Pretoria) is currently operated by the Bakwena consortium under license from the South African National Roads Agency Limited (SANRAL).  Bakwena is in the process of adding a second carriageway to the N4 between Brits and Rustenburg which would also widen the roadway to four lanes.

As of December 2019, the upgrade between Brits and Rosslyn is being constructed, which creates a continuous four-lane dual-carriageway toll freeway from Marikana Road (about 30 km outside Rustenburg) to Pretoria.

The N4 East toll route (Maputo Corridor; east of Pretoria) is currently operated by Trans African Concessions (TRAC) under license from SANRAL. TRAC also operates the short continuation of the road from the Lebombo border post to Maputo (EN4).

References

External links

 South African National Roads Agency
 Bakwena Platinum Corridor (Botswana-Pretoria toll operator)
 Trans African Concessions (Pretoria-Mozambique toll operator)

Highways in South Africa
National Roads in South Africa
Toll roads in South Africa
Roads in South Africa